Radio Gold is a privately owned radio station in Accra, the capital of Ghana. According to rumours 31 December Women's Movement owns 50% shares of the radio station. The radio station was owned and founded by Kwasi Sainti Baffoe-Bonnie.

References

Radio stations in Ghana
Greater Accra Region
Mass media in Accra